Lamecha Girma (born 26 November 2000) is an Ethiopian athlete who specialises in the 3000 metres steeplechase. He is the 2020 Tokyo Olympic silver medallist in the event and won silver medals at the 2019 and 2022 World Athletics Championships. Lamecha took also a silver in the 3000 metres at the 2022 World Indoor Championships. He is the world indoor record holder for the 3000 metres, which was set in February 2023, and holds Ethiopian record in the 3000 m steeplechase.

Career
At age 18, Lamecha Girma earned the junior bronze medal in the 3000 m steeplechase at the 2019 African Under-20 Championships. The same year, he set an Ethiopian national record in his specialist event during the World Athletics Championships in Doha with a time of 8:1.36. He finished second behind only Olympic and world champion Conseslus Kipruto who ran 8:01.35; Soufiane El Bakkali came third in 8:03.76.

At the delayed 2020 Tokyo Olympics in 2021, Lamecha won the silver medal with a 8:10.38 clocking. This time El Bakkali finished first in 8:08.90 while third-placed Benjamin Kigen achieved 8:11.45.

Girma became 2022 World Indoor Championship silver medallist at the 3000 metres in Belgrade. He ran 7:41.63 while his compatriot Selemon Barega clocked 7:41.38 for gold, and Marc Scott was third in 7:42.02. A few months later in July, at the World Championships held in Eugene, Oregon, Girma had to settle for silver once again in his signature event, finishing behind El Bakkali who ran 8:25.13 and ahead of Kipruto in third in 8:27.92.

On 15 February 2023, he smashed the 25-year-old world indoor 3000 m record at the Meeting Hauts-de-France Pas-de-Calais in Liévin with a time of 7:23.81, slicing 1.09 seconds off the previous mark held by Daniel Komen since 1998.

International competitions

Circuit wins
 Diamond League
 3000 metres steeplechase wins, other events specified in parenthesis
 2021: Monaco Herculis
 2022: Rome Golden Gala

Personal bests
 1500 metres – 3:33.77 (Doha 2020)
 1500 metres indoor – 3:35.60 (Val-de-Reuil 2021)
 2000 metres – 4:57.87 (Bydgoszcz 2020)
 3000 metres indoor – 7:23.81 (Liévin 2023) World record
 3000 metres steeplechase – 7:58.68 (Ostrava 2022)

References

External links

 

Ethiopian male steeplechase runners
2000 births
Living people
Sportspeople from Oromia Region
World Athletics Championships athletes for Ethiopia
World Athletics Championships medalists
Athletes (track and field) at the 2020 Summer Olympics
Medalists at the 2020 Summer Olympics
Olympic silver medalists for Ethiopia
Olympic silver medalists in athletics (track and field)
Olympic athletes of Ethiopia
World Athletics Indoor Championships medalists
21st-century Ethiopian people